KXEL (1540 AM), branded as News/Talk 1540, is a Class A, clear-channel radio station serving the Waterloo and Cedar Rapids metropolitan areas with a news/nalk format. KXEL is under ownership of NRG Radio, LLC. KXEL is also the flagship station of the University of Northern Iowa Panther Sports Network.

KXEL is one of two class A stations in Iowa, the other being WHO in Des Moines. It operates at 50,000 watts around the clock from a two-tower facility on the Benton/Tama County line. A single tower is used during the day; due to Iowa's flat land (with near-perfect ground conductivity), it provides at least secondary coverage to most of eastern Iowa during the day (as far west as Des Moines, as far south as Ottumwa and as far east as Iowa City). At night, power is fed to both towers in a directional pattern to protect WCKY in Cincinnati at nearby 1530 AM and CBEF in Windsor, Ontario at nearby 1550 AM. Even with this restriction, it can be heard across most of the central and western United States with a good radio.

History
KXEL was first created by Don E. Kassner, who worked for Joe Dumond. The station began broadcasting on July 14, 1942 and was the first radio facility in the United States to be granted 50,000 watts of power with its original license. It began airing ABC programming from pop hits of the 1940s. KXEL also featured country music programming before switching to its current news/talk format. Dumond later sold KXEL to career broadcaster Egmont Sonderling, then on November 9, 1958, Sonderling signed the papers transferring KXEL's license to Cy N. Bahakel. Woodward Broadcasting owned the station between 2011 and December 2014 before selling it, and its sister stations, to current owner, Cedar Rapids-based NRG Media LLC.

KXEL-FM
On November 16, 1947, KXEL-FM began broadcasting in Waterloo on 105.7 MHz. It was licensed to Josh Higgins Broadcasting Company, which also held the license for KXEL.

Television station try
In the early 1950s, KXEL filed for the channel 7 television license in Waterloo. However, Waterloo's other powerhouse radio station, KWWL (now KPTY, a sister station to KXEL) wanted the license as well. KXEL and KWWL went to court and battled it out.  In the meantime, KXEL built a radio/television studio. This studio was mainly useless because KWWL won the lawsuit and signed on KWWL-TV on November 29, 1953.

References

External links
KXEL News/Talk 1540 - Official Website
KWWL-TV Channel 7 - Official Website

FCC History Cards for KXEL

News and talk radio stations in the United States
XEL
Radio stations established in 1942
1942 establishments in Iowa
NRG Media radio stations
Clear-channel radio stations